Alicia Morel Chaigneau (26 July 1921 – 1 March 2017) was a Chilean writer, novelist, storyteller, poet, and essayist best known for her work in the field of children's literature and theater for children and puppets.

Biography

Early years
Alicia Morel was born on 26 July 1921, to a very well-educated family in which she was the eldest of six children. From a very young age she was extremely interested in literature. Her favorite authors were Oscar Wilde, Lewis Carroll, Hans Christian Andersen, Charles Perrault, the Brothers Grimm, and Selma Lagerlöf, and their work formed the basis of her inspiration to write stories. She also felt a great fascination for the outdoors and nature, and she often observed and studied insects, trees, flowers, and the climate when she went out to play with her siblings and explore in the vicinity of their home.

Her father is described as a generous, tender, and authoritarian man, who used to play the cello. The family went through numerous changes throughout Alicia's childhood. As the years went on, she learned to play the piano and began to write her first stories and poems. These were based in the Cajón del Maipo, a place she frequented for its natural beauty. At age 12 she discovered that her vocation was to write. She was encouraged in this by Jorge Zuloaga, a family friend who provided her with books by authors such as James Joyce, Katherine Mansfield, and González Vera.

Literary career
In 1938, at the young age of 16, Morel began her literary work with a family-published poetry book entitled En el campo y la ciudad, and after this she ventured into various genres such as novels, poetry, Chilean legends, and children's stories. Four years later, Zuloaga invited her to an awards ceremony for the writer Francisco Coloane, for his most famous work, . During this time she worked as a physician's assistant, as she had a great devotion to curing the sick. She also repaired and bound old books.

In 1951, she published her poetry collection Como una raíz de agua, and made a cultural trip to Europe, where she met Gabriela Mistral in Naples, Italy, whom she described as having an aura of strong solitude.

She collaborated with other writers, such as Marcela Paz on Perico trepa por Chile, which was adapted for the theater in 2012.

These stories would later be illustrated by her friend, artist . Around this time she also began to visit schools, where she put on puppet shows, presenting more than 15 stories with dozens of characters.

Morel was one of the founders of International Board on Books for Young People (IBBY) of Chile, together with writers Lucía Gevert Parada, Marcela Paz, and Maité Allamand, among others. She served as vice president of this institution during its early years. She also collaborated on various educational projects, creating a magazine for the ASIMET Compensation Fund and writing for the biannual magazine El Volantín.

Awards and recognition
During her professional career, Morel received several honors, among them the Order of Merit of the World Council of Education in 1989 and two tributes to her career, at the 21st International Fair of Children's and Young Adult Books in 2007 and the Iberoamerican Congress of Language and Children's and Young Adult Literature (Congreso iberoamericano de lengua y literatura infantil y juvenil; CILELJ) in 2010. In the latter year she was selected to represent Chile at the Hans Christian Andersen Awards.

Personal life
Alicia Morel's sister Eduardo Morel Chaignau was the aunt of Cecilia Morel Montes, the First Lady of Chile from 2010 to 2014.

Morel married politician William Thayer Arteaga, with whom she had seven children.

Works

Poetry
 1938: En el campo y la ciudad
 1951: Como una raíz de agua
 1990: El árbol de los cielos
 2007: Color del tiempo

Novels
 1940: Juanilla, Juanillo y la Abuela
 1965: El jardín de Dionisio
 1978: Perico trepa por Chile (as coauthor with Marcela Paz)
 1988: El viaje de los duendes al otro lado del mundo
 2001: El fabricante de risas
 2001: La conquista del rocío
 2002: El viaje de los invisibles
 2010: Espejos Paralelos

Short stories
 1973: Cuentos de la Pícara Polita
 1978: Nuestros cuentos (anthology of Chilean authors)
 1983: Cuentos Araucanos, La gente de la Tierra
 1983: La noche en la ventana
 1985: Polita va a la escuela
 1996: Polita en el bosque
 1999: Las manchas de Vinca 2004: Mozart cuenta la Flauta Mágica, cuento 2007: Travesuras de Polita 2008: El Cururo incomprendido 2010: El secreto del caracol 1991: Polita aprende el mundo 1991: La Hoja Viajera 1991: Cuentos de tesoros y monedas de oro 1992: Una aguja y un dedal 1993: Cuentos de la lluvia 1994: Aventuras del Duende Melodía 1994: El baile de los cantaritos 1994: La cartera azul y Amigos del bosque 1978: El Increíble Mundo de Llanca 1995: El cururo incomprendido 2015: Cuentos de la PanchitaTranslations
 1990: Translation of The King of the Golden River by John Ruskin
 1981: Translation of The Little Prince, by Antoine de Saint-Exupéry
 1982: Translation of The Garden Party by Katherine Mansfield

Other
 1956: La Hormiguita Cantora y el Duende Melodía 1977: ¿Quién soy? (essay)
 1984: Los viajes misteriosos de María (essay)
 1986: La flauta encantada (puppetry and theater for children)
 1990: Variaciones Literarias (essays on Virginia Woolf and Katherine Mansfield)
 1991: Hagamos títeres (teaching text and five works for puppets)
 1995: La Era del Sueño (essay)
 1996: Leyendas bajo la Cruz del Sur 2004: La Biblia contada para ti (as coauthor with )
 2005: La última polilla del otoño 2006: Una mariposa en apuros, El baile del Picaflor 2007: Polita en el bosque 2009: El Paraguas mágico 2009: Polita Aprende el mundo y Polita va a la escuela''

References

External links

 Alicia Morel at the Biblioteca Virtual Miguel de Cervantes

1921 births
2017 deaths
20th-century Chilean women writers
20th-century Chilean dramatists and playwrights
21st-century Chilean women writers
21st-century Chilean dramatists and playwrights
Chilean women dramatists and playwrights
Chilean people of French descent
Chilean women essayists
Chilean women poets
20th-century Chilean poets
21st-century Chilean poets